Prague 10 is both a municipal and administrative district in Prague, Czech Republic with more than 100,000 inhabitants.

Twin towns
Ballerup, Denmark
Prešov, Slovakia
Nyíregyháza, Hungary
Jasło, Poland

Neighbourhood (cadastral communities) of Prague 10
 Vršovice
 large part of Strašnice (except the block with Tesla Strašnice and part of Nákladové nádraží Žižkov, which fall within the city district Prague 3)
 small part of Vinohrady (south and east from the streets Slovenská, U vodárny, Korunní, Šrobárova, U vinohradského hřbitova a Vinohradská)
 large part of Malešice 
 part of Záběhlice 
 part of Michle (Bohdalec and the greater part of the Slatiny settlement)
 small part of Žižkov
 other small parts

Important Buildings
Hus' House (Vinohrady)
Trmalova Villa
Strašnice Crematory
Vršovice Castle
Vlasta Neighborhood
Vršovice Savings Bank Building

See also
Districts of Prague#Symbols

References

External links 
 Prague 10 - Official homepage

 
Districts of Prague